Seis bagatelas is a 1987 work by Juan Maria Solare for trio of flutes. The world premiere was in Mendoza on 15 November 2000, at the Auditorio of the Escuela de Música of the Universidad Nacional de Cuyo. It was played by Virginia Rivarola, Cecilia Ulloque and Irina Gruszka. The European premiere was performed by the Trio Soli Sono at the Berliner Kabarett Anstalt, Berlin, on 26 December 2000.
The work has been published by Verlag Dohr in Cologne (Germany).

Compositions by Juan María Solare
Compositions for flute